Terre d'Adige is a comune (municipality) in Trentino in the northern Italian region Trentino-Alto Adige/Südtirol, located about  north of Trento.

Terre d'Adige borders the following municipalities: Lavis, Vallelaghi, Andalo, Fai della Paganella, Mezzolombardo and San Michele all'Adige.

The comune was established on 1 January 2019 after the merger of the municipalities of Nave San Rocco and Zambana.

References

Cities and towns in Trentino-Alto Adige/Südtirol